Gelastocera is a genus of moth in the family Nolidae.

Species
 Gelastocera castanea Moore, 1879
 Gelastocera discalis Draudt, 1950
 Gelastocera eminentissima Bryk, 1948
 Gelastocera exusta Butler, 1877
 Gelastocera fuscibasis Draudt 1950
 Gelastocera hallasana Ronkay, 1998
 Gelastocera insignata Wileman, 1911
 Gelastocera kotshubeji Obraztsov, 1943
 Gelastocera motoyukiseinoi Kishida, 2010
 Gelastocera ochroleucana Staudinger, 1887
 Gelastocera rubicundula Wileman, 1911
 Gelastocera sutshana Obraztsov, 1950
 Gelastocera viridimacula Warren, 1916

References

Nolidae
Insects described in 1877
Noctuoidea genera